Paula Tiso is an American voiceover actress 

Paula T works in many areas  of voiceover including, broadcast narration, news promo, radio imaging, and commercial as well as video games and dubbing 

She has narrated the true crime Oxygen series “Living With a Serial Killer”, season 2 and the ID channel series The Devil Speaks, as well as series on The History Channel and the Smithsonian Channel.  

Paula also works in video games, appearing in Fallout 76” and Lego The IncrediblesDuchess (Fallout 76)” and is known for voicing Lulu in Final Fantasy X and Final Fantasy X-2 Sylvia ChristelNo More Heroes series of games

Filmography

Animation
As Told by Ginger - Polly Shuster
Dexter's Laboratory - Agent Honeydew (Episode "Dial M for Monkey: Simion" only)
Mighty Max - Caitlin
Rugrats - Henny Penny
Static Shock - Counter Girl
The Grim Adventures of Billy & Mandy - Atrocia / Gregory
Z-Squad - Jeanie

Japanese anime
.hack//Legend of the Twilight - Ohka
Burn-Up Excess - Ruby
Geneshaft - Alice / Karen / Mir Lotus
Kaze No Yojimbo - Maki
Makai Senki Disgaea - Jennifer
Snack World - Additional voices
Vampire Princess Miyu - Kasumi Kimihara

Live action
CBS Schoolbreak Special - Hostess

Video games

Champions: Return to Arms
Destroy All Humans! - Suburban Female / Female Vocalizations
Destroy All Humans! 2 - Additional Voices
Destroy All Humans! Big Willy Unleashed - Mindy Peters
Dungeons & Dragons: Dragonshard - Various
Eternal Darkness: Sanity's Requiem - Chandra
EverQuest II - Tibby Copperpot / Noelle Dering / Fhara Hunford / Seer Eco / Commissioner Venilos / Liege Helvanica / Guard Williamson / Wanderer Greencoast / Preservationist Reynolds / Chronicler Steelwill / Banker Deephathom / Japhet L'Zon / Broker Profallia
Fallout 76 - Duchess / Ella Ames / Geraldine Fitzsimmons
Fallout 76: Wastelanders - Duchess / Gladys Filtcher / The Eye's Executioner / Cultists
Fire Emblem: Fates - Camilla / Orochi
Final Fantasy X - Lulu
Final Fantasy X-2 - Lulu
Final Fantasy XIII - Jihl Nabaat
Final Fantasy XIII-2 - Jihl Nabaat
JumpStart SpyMasters: Unmask the Prankster - Jess / Jo Hammet
Kingdoms of Amalur: Reckoning
La Pucelle Tactics - Papillion
Lego The Incredibles - Sally Sundae
Metal Gear Solid: Portable Ops - Female Scientist
Metal Gear Solid 4: Guns of the Patriots - Laughing Octopus (Beauty voice)
Neopets: Petpet Adventures: The Wand of Wishing - Megan
No More Heroes - Sylvia Christel / Mrs. Christel
No More Heroes 2: Desperate Struggle - Sylvia Christel
No More Heroes III - Sylvia Christel
Persona 3 - Fuuka Yamagishi
Saints Row: The Third - Additional Voices
Saints Row IV - The Voices of Virtual Steelport
Sword of the Berserk: Guts' Rage - Rita / Annette
Syphon Filter: Dark Mirror - Blake Hargrove
The Lord of the Rings: War in the North - Elaure
The Punisher
The Sopranos: Road to Respect
The Wonderful 101 - Vijounne, Additional Wonderful Ones

References

External links
Official Website

Interview at AtomicGamer

Year of birth missing (living people)
American video game actresses
American voice actresses
Living people
20th-century American actresses
21st-century American actresses
Place of birth missing (living people)